Douglas Murray may refer to:

 Douglas Murray (author) (born 1979), British political journalist, author and commentator
 Doug Murray (comics) (born 1947), American comic book writer
 Douglas Murray (ice hockey) (born 1980), Swedish ice hockey player
 Douglas Murray (politician) (active 1981–82), Canadian politician in Prince Edward Island